Tatyana Bocharova-Konichsheva (born 22 April 1983) is a Kazakhstani long and triple jumper.

She finished sixth at the 2002 World Junior Championships and won the bronze medal at the 2002 Asian Games. She also competed at the 2003 World Championships, the 2004 World Indoor Championships and the 2004 Olympic Games without reaching the finals.

Her personal best jump is 14.07 metres, achieved in July 2003 in Almaty. The Kazakhstani record is currently held by Yelena Parfenova with 14.23 metres.

Competition record

References

1983 births
Living people
Kazakhstani female triple jumpers
Kazakhstani female long jumpers
Athletes (track and field) at the 2004 Summer Olympics
Olympic athletes of Kazakhstan
Asian Games medalists in athletics (track and field)
Athletes (track and field) at the 2010 Asian Games
Athletes (track and field) at the 2002 Asian Games
Asian Games bronze medalists for Kazakhstan
Medalists at the 2002 Asian Games